St Dominick, Harrowbarrow and Kelly Bray was an electoral division of Cornwall in the United Kingdom which returned one member to sit on Cornwall Council between 2013 and 2021. It was abolished at the 2021 local elections, being succeeded by Calstock and Callington and St Dominic.

Councillors

Extent
St Dominick, Harrowbarrow and Kelly Bray represented the villages of Kelly Bray, Latchley, Chilsworthy, St Dominick, Harrowbarrow, Norris Green, Bohetherick, St Mellion and Metherell, and the hamlets of Ashton and Newton. It covered 4070 hectares in total.

Election results

2017 election

2013 election

References

Electoral divisions of Cornwall Council